Jerzy Janowicz was the defending champion but chose not to defend his title.

Stefanos Tsitsipas won the title after defeating Guillermo García López 7–5, 7–6(7–2) in the final.

Seeds

Draw

Finals

Top half

Bottom half

References
Main Draw
Qualifying Draw

AON Open Challenger - Singles
2017 Singles
AON